Shane Walsh (born 4 June 1993) is a Gaelic footballer who plays for the Kilmacud Crokes club and at senior level for the Galway county team. He previously played for the Kilkerrin-Clonberne club from 2010 to 2022.

Club

Kilkerrin-Clonberne
Walsh played for the  Kilkerrin-Clonberne club in North Galway from 2010 to 2022. They compete in the Galway Intermediate Football Championship.

Kilmacud transfer
On 30 July 2022, news emerged that Walsh was seeking a transfer to reigning Dublin Senior Football Champions Kilmacud Crokes. 

On 1 August 2022, he confirmed his intention to join Kilmacud Crokes in time to play in the upcoming Dublin championship. In a brief statement, Walsh pointed out that he was now studying and living in Dublin and that while he intended to return to his home club of Kilkerrin-Clonberne before the end of his playing days, a switch to the Stillorgan-based club was "the right move" for him. His transfer was completed on 25 August.

Walsh made his debut as a substitute on 4 September against  Templeogue Synge Street. He scored 0-1 in their 3-25 to 1-06 win.

He scored 1-3 in the 2023 All-Ireland Senior Club Football Championship Final and in the process won his first All-Ireland Senior Club Football Championship.

Inter-county
Walsh joined the Galway county football team in 2013 after a highly successful underage county and schools career with St Jarlath's College, Tuam.

Walsh was nominated for both an All-Star and the Young Footballer of the Year award in 2014. In addition he has received All Star nominations in 2018, 2020 and 2021.

He has reached All-Ireland Senior Football Championship Quarter Finals in 2014 and 2016. An All-Ireland Senior Football Championship Semi Final in 2018.

He is the winner of three Connacht Senior Football Championships in 2016, 2018 and 2021.

Galway captaincy
Galway manager Pádraic Joyce named Walsh as captain ahead of the 2020 season. He remained as captain for two seasons until Joyce appointed Seán Kelly as his successor ahead of the 2022 season.

2022 season
Walsh was at the centre of an incident during the first half of Galway's 2022 All-Ireland SFC semi-final win against Derry when the Hawk-Eye score detection system malfunctioned and overruled an umpire who signalled that Walsh's '45 into Hill 16 late in the half had gone over the bar. This meant that Galway entered the half-time break a point behind. However, the referee retrospectively awarded the point and the game resumed for the second half with the teams level on the scoreboard.

Walsh was voted Footballer of the Week on the GAA.ie website after Galway's defeat in the 2022 All-Ireland SFC final, a game in which he scored nine points. He also won an All Star that year.

Career statistics
 As of match played 24 July 2022

Honours

Galway
 Connacht Under-21 Football Championship (1): 2013
 All-Ireland Under-21 Football Championship (1): 2013
 Connacht Senior Football Championship (3): 2016, 2018, 2022

Kilmacud Crokes
 All-Ireland Senior Club Football Championship (1): 2023
 Leinster Senior Club Football Championship (1): 2022
 Dublin Senior Football Championship (1): 2022

Individual
The Sunday Game Team of the Year: 2022
All Star (1): 2022

References

External links

1993 births
Living people
All Stars Awards winners (football)
Gaelic football forwards
Galway inter-county Gaelic footballers
Kilkerrin-Clonberne Gaelic footballers